Amin Iqbal is a Pakistani television/film director and writer. He has directed several television series including Dil Muhallay Ki Haveli, Mannat and Deedan. His work as a director on Dushman e Jaan  earned him a nomination for Best Television Director at the Pakistan International Screen Awards.

Career 
Iqbal started his career as a writer and director from Pakistan Television Network. He first directed and wrote the television series such as Biche Ge Ab Kese, Dobara and Imehaan. The first project of Iqbal which received positive response was Thakan which starred Saba Qamar, Tauqeer Nasir and Saba Hameed in leading roles and revolves around the issues of a working women in a patriarchal system. He then directed Teri Raah Main Rul Gai, Meri Dulari and Dil Muhallay Ki Haveli, all of which featured Yumna Zaidi and Sami Khan as a lead couple and earned him further recognition. Iqbal then directed three other projects for Geo Entertainment; Meri Zindagi Hai Tu, which revolves around the obsession of a girl with her aunt's fiancé, Mannat, a love story of a pressurised relationship and Dilfareb, love triangle themed penned by Zafar Mairaj which further established his career as a director.

In 2018, he directed Mohib Mirza and Sanam Saeed starrer Deedan which revolves around the love story of two individuals and was shot in the Hunza Valley. The series was praised for its aesthetics and visuals. His next project Dushman e Jaan met with reviews from critics and audience, earned him critical acclaim and became first critical success of his career. Iqbal's recently directed Ishq E Laa starring Sajal Aly, Yumna Zaidi and Azaan Sami Khan is currently airing on Hum TV.

Filmography 
 Rehbra

Television

Awards and nominations 
 Nominated - 2nd Pakistan International Screen Awards - Best Television Director - Dushman e Jaan

References 

Year of birth missing (living people)
Living people
Pakistani film directors
Pakistani writers